United States v. Davis may refer to:

United States v. Davis (1962), a U.S. Supreme Court opinion on tax treatment of divorce settlements 
United States v. Davis (2014), an 11th Circuit ruling on the need for a warrant to obtain cell phone location data
United States v. Davis (2019), a U.S. Supreme Court opinion on the residual clause of the Hobbs Act

See also
 Davis v. United States (disambiguation)